Eucalyptus boliviana, commonly known as Bolivia Hill stringybark or Bolivia stringybark is a shrub or a mallee, sometimes a small tree and is endemic to a small area in northern New South Wales. It is a stringybark with four-sides stems, broadly lance-shaped adult leaves, flower buds arranged in groups of seven, yellow flowers and hemispherical to broadly funnel-shaped fruit.

Description
The bark on the trunk and larger branches is greyish and stringy. The thinner stems are distinctly four sided with wings at each edge. Mature buds are oval to broadly spindle-shaped with a conical operculum. Flowering mainly occurs in September and the flowers are yellow.

Taxonomy and naming
Eucalyptus boliviana was first formally described in 2001 by John Beaumont Williams and  Ken Hill and the description was published in the journal Telopea. The specific epithet (boliviana) refers to this species' occurrence on Bolivia Hill.

Distribution and habitat
Bolivia Hill stringbark is restricted to Bolivia Hill between Glen Innes and Tenterfield where it grows in woodland between granite outcrops.

Conservation
This eucalypt is classified as "vulnerable" under the New South Wales Government Biodiversity Conservation Act 2016.

References

boliviana
Myrtales of Australia
Flora of New South Wales
Trees of Australia
Plants described in 2001
Taxa named by John Beaumont Williams